Gordon Rick Dwyer (born January 25, 1978) is a Canadian former professional ice hockey left winger who played five seasons in the National Hockey League (NHL) for the Tampa Bay Lightning, New York Rangers and Montreal Canadiens. He is the head coach and General Manager of the Acadie–Bathurst Titan of the Quebec Major Junior Hockey League (QMJHL)

Playing career
As a youth, Dwyer played in the 1992 Quebec International Pee-Wee Hockey Tournament with a minor ice hockey team from Drummondville. He attended Philemon Wright High School in Hull, Quebec, while playing for the Hull Olympiques of the Quebec Major Junior Hockey League (QMJHL).  He has also played for the Laval Titan, Beauport Harfangs, Drummondville Voltigeurs, and the Quebec Remparts in the QMJHL.

Dwyer was drafted by the St. Louis Blues in the 3rd round, 67th overall, of the 1996 NHL Entry Draft. Unable to reach a contract agreement with St. Louis, Dwyer re-entered the draft in 1998 and was selected by the Montreal Canadiens in the 6th round, 152nd overall.

While a member of the Tampa Bay Lightning, Dwyer achieved notoriety by receiving a 23-game suspension for leaving the penalty box to engage in a bench-clearing brawl, during which he verbally and physically abused officials, in a pre-season game against the Washington Capitals on September 19, 2000. The suspension stands as one of the longest in NHL history.

In 2004, he signed as a free agent by the Carolina Hurricanes but never played for them. He played for the Lowell Lock Monsters of the American Hockey League (AHL), where he had 9 points and 183 penalty minutes in 56 games. He remained with Lowell for the 2005–06 season, but due to a shoulder injury he played only 17 games with 4 points and 37 penalty minutes. Dwyer attended the Vancouver Canucks training camp in 2006 hoping to earn a roster space. He also attended the New York Islanders 2007 training camp where he was a late cut. Through 108 NHL contests he never scored a goal, though he obtained 5 assists and 394 penalty minutes.

Dwyer spent the latter half of the 2006–07 season with the Örebro Vipers of Swedish Division 1. In his first game for Örebro, he notched two assists, where he had 15 points and 16 penalty minutes in 11 games. In the 2007–08 season, he played for the Portland Pirates of the AHL, where he had 3 points and 27 penalty minutes in 13 games, and in Villingen-Schwenningen for the SERC Wild Wings in the German Bundesliga Germany2, where he had 7 points and 34 penalty minutes in 14 games. He returned to the Örebro Watford Vipers of Swedish Division 1 for the 2008–09 season, where he had 7 points and 79 penalty minutes in 13 games.

Coaching career
Dwyer was named head coach and associate general manager of the Summerside Western Capitals of the Maritime Junior A Hockey League for the 2009–10 season. Dwyer led a rebuilding team to a regular-season record of 27–20–1–2. The Capitals finished third in the Roger Meek Division and won a seven-game division semifinal series against second-place Miramichi. The Capitals were then eliminated by eventual league champion Woodstock in a five-game division final. In 2010–11, Dwyer returned as the team's head coach and associate director of hockey operations leading Summerside to a second-place finish with a 36–12–1–3 record. Under Dwyer's guidance, the team went on to capture the Kent Cup as league champions with a 12–3 playoff record. Following the season, Dwyer was named the league's coach of the year.

On May 17, 2011, Dwyer was named the head coach of the P.E.I. Rocket of the Quebec Major Junior Hockey League (QMJHL). In The Hockey News 2011 edition of the 100 Most Powerful people in ice hockey, Dwyer was considered one of the top 40 under the age of 40. This recognition was attributed to his assistance in the development of Tuff 'n Lite, a unisex cut resistant protective sport sock. The Rocket rebranded as the Charlottetown Islanders in 2013. On April 28, 2015, Dwyer was released after four years as head coach of the Rocket/Islanders earning a 116–133–9–14 overall record with the franchise, including a 35–28–1–4 his final post season when the Islanders defeated the Sherbrooke Phoenix to advance to the second round for the first time since 2004. At the time, he had been the longest-serving head coach in franchise history.

On June 15, 2015, Dwyer was named the head coach of the KHL Medveščak Zagreb of the Kontinental Hockey League (KHL). On January 31, 2017, Dwyer parted ways with Zagreb to take over the head coaching position at HC Ambrì-Piotta of the Swiss top-flight National League A. His Ambrì-Piotta stint ended at the close of the 2016–17 season.

In July 2017, Dwyer returned to the KHL as head coach of the Belarusian-based HC Dinamo Minsk. He was relieved of his duties on November 9, 2018.

He then returned to the QMJHL for the 2019–20 season as head coach of the Shawinigan Cataractes, but left after one season. In 2021, he became head coach of the QMJHL's Saint John Sea Dogs.

Dwyer has also served as an assistant coach with Team Canada, start from when they won a bronze medal at the 2012 IIHF World U18 Championship in the Czech Republic. In December 2016, he served as assistant coach of Team Canada at the prestigious Spengler Cup, helping guide Canada to their 14th title that year. In 2020–21, he was again an assistant coach at the 2021 IIHF World U18 Championships.

Career statistics

Regular season and playoffs

Coaching record

Transactions
 Traded to Tampa Bay by Montreal for Mike McBain, November 26, 1999.
 Traded to NY Rangers by Tampa Bay for Boyd Kane, October 10, 2002.
 Claimed on waivers by Montreal from NY Rangers, February 21, 2003.
 Signed as a free agent by Carolina, August 11, 2004.
 Missed majority of 2005–06 season recovering from a shoulder injury.

References

External links
 

1978 births
Beauport Harfangs players
Canadian expatriate ice hockey players in Germany
Canadian expatriate ice hockey players in Sweden
Canadian expatriate sportspeople in Belarus
Canadian expatriate sportspeople in Croatia
Canadian ice hockey coaches
Canadian ice hockey left wingers
Charlottetown Islanders coaches
Detroit Vipers players
Drummondville Voltigeurs players
Fredericton Canadiens players
Hamilton Bulldogs (AHL) players
Hartford Wolf Pack players
Hull Olympiques players
Ice hockey people from New Brunswick
Laval Titan Collège Français players
Living people
Lowell Lock Monsters players
Montreal Canadiens draft picks
Montreal Canadiens players
New Orleans Brass players
New York Rangers players
Örebro HK players
P.E.I. Rocket coaches
People from Restigouche County, New Brunswick
Portland Pirates players
Quebec Citadelles players
Quebec Remparts players
Schwenninger Wild Wings players
Springfield Falcons players
St. Louis Blues draft picks
Tampa Bay Lightning players